Vorsø is a small Danish island, with an area of 0.62 km2 and a population of 1.

References 

Islands of Denmark
Geography of Horsens Municipality